Pelagius of Constance was, a child martyr put to death in Pannonia during the persecution of Roman Emperor Numerian. He was first revered in Novigrad (Cittanova) in Istria, Croatia.

Background
Pelagius is the patron saint of Konstanz and the Cathedral of Konstanz, owing to the transfer of relics that were believed to be his to that city before or around 904 AD. He usually does not have a face in his depictions.

Gallery

References

External links
 

270 births
283 deaths
Hungarian saints
Christian child saints
3rd-century Christian martyrs